Korey Jones (born April 4, 1989) is a former professional Canadian football linebacker. He first enrolled at Garden City Community College before transferring to the University of Wyoming. He attended Rocky Mountain High School in Fort Collins, Colorado. Jones has also been a member of the Arizona Cardinals, BC Lions, Green Bay Packers, Florida Blacktips, Edmonton Eskimos, Saskatchewan Roughriders, Winnipeg Blue Bombers.

College career

Garden City Community College
Jones first played college football from 2009 to 2010 for the Garden City Broncbusters. He accumulated 108 tackles, four sacks and a fumble recovery. He earned Honorable Mention All-Conference honors his sophomore year in 2010.

University of Wyoming
Jones was a two-year starter for the Wyoming Cowboys from 2011 to 2012. He recorded career totals of 162 tackles and four sacks in 25 games. He started the first five games of the 2011 season at defensive end before moving to linebacker for the final eight games. Jones was a team captain his senior year in 2012.

Professional career

Arizona Cardinals
Jones signed with the Arizona Cardinals on April 29, 2013 after going unselected in the 2013 NFL Draft. He was released by the team on August 25, 2013.

BC Lions
Jones joined the BC Lions of the Canadian Football League in September 2013. He was released by the Lions on June 21, 2014.

Green Bay Packers
He was signed by the Green Bay Packers on July 24, 2014. He was released on August 24, 2014.

Florida Blacktips
Jones played for the Florida Blacktips of the Fall Experimental Football League in 2014.

Edmonton Eskimos
Jones signed with the Edmonton Eskimos (CFL) on April 30, 2015. Jones played in all 18 regular season games, amassing 25 defensive tackles and 13 special teams tackles and won the Grey Cup to close the season. He was released by the team on May 29, 2016.

Saskatchewan Roughriders
Jones was signed by the Saskatchewan Roughriders (CFL) on June 16, 2016. Jones played 13 games for the Roughriders in the 2016 season, contributing 18 defensive tackles, 11 special teams tackles, and 1 forced fumble.

Edmonton Eskimos (II) 
On April 15, 2017 Jones signed with the Edmonton Eskimos (CFL), with whom he spent the 2015 CFL season. He was released on June 24, 2019.

Winnipeg Blue Bombers 
Jones signed a practice roster contract with the Winnipeg Blue Bombers on July 16, 2019. He was promoted to the active roster on August 7, 2019.

Edmonton Eskimos (III) 
Jones re-signed with the Edmonton Eskimos on February 11, 2020. He retired on March 9, 2020.

References

External links
Just Sports stats
College stats
Edmonton Eskimos bio

1989 births
Living people
African-American players of American football
African-American players of Canadian football
American football linebackers
American football defensive ends
Arizona Cardinals players
BC Lions players
Blacktips (FXFL) players
Canadian football linebackers
Edmonton Elks players
Saskatchewan Roughriders players
Garden City Broncbusters football players
Players of American football from Colorado
Sportspeople from Fort Collins, Colorado
Wyoming Cowboys football players
Green Bay Packers players
Winnipeg Blue Bombers players
21st-century African-American sportspeople
20th-century African-American people